The 2018 French Grand Prix (formally known as the Formula 1 Pirelli Grand Prix de France 2018) was a Formula One motor race that took place on 24 June 2018 at the Circuit Paul Ricard in Le Castellet, France. The race was the eighth round of the 2018 FIA Formula One World Championship and marked the first time that the French Grand Prix has been run since .

Ferrari driver Sebastian Vettel entered the race with a one-point lead over Lewis Hamilton in the World Drivers' Championship. In the World Constructors' Championship, Mercedes led Ferrari by seventeen points. Hamilton took the lead in the Driver's Championship by winning the race, with Vettel finishing fifth.

Background
The race returned to the calendar for the first time since , with Circuit Paul Ricard chosen as the venue. The race used the  layout of the Circuit Paul Ricard for the first time.

The race was run in June, filling a vacancy left by the Azerbaijan Grand Prix. The race in Azerbaijan was moved to an April date to avoid clashing with celebrations for the centenary of the Azerbaijan Democratic Republic.

Drag reduction system
The circuit featured two drag reduction system (DRS) zones. The first was located along the main straight, while the second was on the Mistral Straight on the approach to the chicane.

Tyres
Tyre supplier Pirelli provided teams with the soft, supersoft and ultrasoft compounds of tyres. They reverted to their narrow tread compound following feedback from the teams in the wake of mid-season testing at the Circuit de Barcelona-Catalunya.

Free practice
Lewis Hamilton set the fastest lap in the first free practice session, which was cut short by an accident involving Sauber driver Marcus Ericsson. Ericsson lost control of his Sauber C37 on the approach to Turn 11 and spun into the barrier on the outside of the corner. The car hit the tyre wall at an angle and subsequently caught fire. Ericsson was unharmed, but with two minutes remaining the session was abandoned and the damage to his car so extensive that he was unable to take part in the second free practice session. Several drivers experienced spins during the session, most notably at Turn 6 where an intermittent and gusty local wind caught the drivers unaware as they accelerated away from the apex of the corner. Unlike Ericsson, all of the drivers avoided contact with the wall courtesy of the circuit's unique, abrasive tarmac run-off areas designed to slow down cars that left the circuit.

Hamilton was fastest again in the second free practice session despite having his flying lap interrupted by another red flag. Sergio Pérez lost a wheel as he turned onto the Mistral Straight, prompting race officials to mount an investigation as to whether Force India had released Pérez from the pit lane with his car in an unsafe condition. The session was restarted once Pérez's car was cleared away.

Qualifying 

Notes
  – Brendon Hartley received a 35-place grid penalty for exceeding his quota of power unit components.

Race

Race report 
At the start Sebastian Vettel ran into the back of Valtteri Bottas, with both sustaining damage and having to pit for repairs, also there was a separate collision between Pierre Gasly and Esteban Ocon leaving both cars stranded out on the track, this brought out a brief safety car period lasting till the end of lap 5. Vettel would later receive a penalty for his collision with Bottas which meant he would only manage to finish 5th. Lance Stroll suffered a tyre puncture near the end of the race causing a virtual safety car, which ended with only half a lap left of the race. Lewis Hamilton comfortably won ahead of Max Verstappen, while Kimi Räikkönen completed the podium.

Race classification 

Notes
  – Sergey Sirotkin had 5 seconds added to his race time for driving unnecessarily slowly behind the safety car.
  – Fernando Alonso and Lance Stroll retired from the race, but were classified as they completed more than 90% of the race distance.

Championship standings after the race

Drivers' Championship standings

Constructors' Championship standings

 Note: Only the top five positions are included for both sets of standings.

See also
 2018 Le Castellet Formula 2 round
 2018 Le Castellet GP3 Series round

Notes

References

External links

French Grand Prix
French
Grand Prix
French Grand Prix